Florida International Boarding Higher Secondary School is a school in Mahendranagar, in Far-Western Nepal.

Buildings and structures in Kanchanpur District
Boarding schools in Nepal
Secondary schools in Nepal
Educational institutions established in 2000
2000 establishments in Nepal